Senator Bourne may refer to:

Jonathan Bourne Jr. (1855–1940), U.S. Senator from Oregon from 1907 to 1913
Patrick Bourne (born 1964), Nebraska State Senate
Vicki Bourne (born 1954), Australian Senator from New South Wales from 1990 to 2002

See also
Augustus O. Bourn (1834–1925), Rhode Island State Senate